Böyük Qışlaq (also, Böyükqışlaq, Bëyuk Kyshlak, Beyuk-Kyshlag, and Böyükqıslaq) is a village and municipality in the Tovuz Rayon of Azerbaijan.  It has a population of 2,758.  The municipality consists of the villages of Böyük Qışlaq, Məsimlər, Mollalar, Səfərli, and Şamlıq.

References 

Populated places in Tovuz District